Young Lions & Old Tigers is a 1995 studio album by American jazz pianist Dave Brubeck.

Recorded to celebrate Brubeck's 75th birthday, the album features guests such as Jon Hendricks, Roy Hargrove, Michael Brecker and George Shearing.

References

1995 albums
Dave Brubeck albums
Telarc Records albums